A barrier pipe is a type of plastic water pipe used in domestic heating systems. The pipe is manufactured with a barrier that prevents oxygen from penetrating the material and entering the water system, reducing the risk of corrosion.
The 'barrier' is usually a resin material bonded between the outer and inner layer of the pipe itself. The pipe being either a cross linked polyethylene or polybutylene.

Heating, ventilation, and air conditioning